3-Way is a block cipher.

3-Way, 3Way, three-way, or three way may also refer to:

 3WAY, Australian community radio station
 Three-way or threesome, three people having sexual intercourse together
 Three Way, Tennessee, a city in Madison County
 Three Way, Texas, a small unincorporated community in Erath County
 3-way junction, road junction type
 3Way International Logistics, a freight forwarding company in Ontario
 Cincinnati chili Three-way, a serving variant of Cincinnati-style chili

Popular culture
 "Three-Way" (CSI: Miami), 2005 CSI: Miami episode
 Three Way (film), a 2004 film based on Gil Brewer's 1963 pulp novel Wild to Possess
 Three Way (opera), a 2016 opera with music by Robert Paterson (composer) and a libretto by David Cote
 "3-Way (The Golden Rule)", a 2011 song and short video from Saturday Night Live
 3 Way (web series), starring Maeve Quinlan and Kristy Swanson

Technology
 3-way speaker, loudspeaker system with low, medium and high frequency drivers
 3-way switch, interconnected electrical switches to control an electrical load
 3-way bulb, incandescent light bulb with two filaments and three light settings
 Three-way calling, a telephone call involving two called parties
 Three-way handshake, a process in Transmission Control Protocol connecting a client and a server
 Three-way comparison, in computer science, comparison of the values of two quantities in a single operation

See also
 Ménage à Trois (disambiguation)
 Party line (disambiguation)
 Two-way (disambiguation)